Tokhoryukta (Tokhoriuugta) is a rural locality (an ulus) in Khorinsky District, Republic of Buryatia, Russia. The population was 251 as of 2010. There are 2 streets.

Geography 
Tokhoryukta is located 126 km northwest of Khorinsk (the district's administrative centre) by road. Barun-Khasurta is the nearest rural locality.

References 

Rural localities in Khorinsky District